Gummere is a surname. Notable people with the surname include:

Francis Barton Gummere (1855–1919), American folklorist
John Gummere (1784–1845), American astronomer 
Samuel R. Gummere (1849–1920), American lawyer and diplomat
William Stryker Gummere (1852–1933), American chief justice